Baryshsky District  is an administrative and municipal district (raion), one of the twenty-one in Ulyanovsk Oblast, Russia. It is located in the west of the oblast. Its administrative center is the town of Barysh. Population: 44,034 (2010 Census);  The population of Barysh accounts for 38.9% of the district's total population.

References

Notes

Sources

Districts of Ulyanovsk Oblast